Japan Air Lines Flight 123 was a scheduled domestic passenger flight from Tokyo to Osaka, Japan. On August 12, 1985, the Boeing 747 operating the service suffered a severe structural failure and decompression 12 minutes into the flight. After flying under minimal control for a further 32 minutes, the 747 crashed in the area of Mount Takamagahara,  from Tokyo.

The aircraft, featuring a high-density seating configuration, was carrying 524 people. All 15 crew members and 505 of the 509 passengers died in the accident. Some of the fatalities survived the initial impact but died of their injuries hours later while awaiting rescue. All four survivors were seriously injured. The crash of Flight 123 is the deadliest single-aircraft accident in aviation history.

Japan's Aircraft Accident Investigation Commission (AAIC), assisted by the U.S. National Transportation Safety Board, concluded that the structural failure was caused by a faulty repair by Boeing technicians following a tailstrike incident suffered by the accident aircraft seven years earlier. When the faulty repair eventually failed, it resulted in a rapid decompression that ripped off a large portion of the tail and caused the loss of all on-board hydraulic systems, disabling the aircraft's flight controls.

Background

Aircraft 
The accident aircraft, a Boeing 747SR-46, registration JA8119 (serial number 20783, line number 230), was built and delivered to Japan Air Lines in 1974. It had accumulated slightly more than 25,000 flight hours and 18,800 cycles at the time of the accident (one cycle consisting of takeoff, cabin pressurization, depressurisation, and landing).

1978 tailstrike incident 
On June 2, 1978, while operating Japan Air Lines Flight 115 along the same route, JA8119 bounced heavily on landing while carrying out an instrument approach to runway 32L at Itami Airport. The pilot then excessively flared the aircraft, causing a severe tail strike on the second touchdown. No fatalities occurred among the 394 people on board, but 25 people were injured, 23 minor and 2 serious. The tailstrike cracked open the aft pressure bulkhead. The damage was repaired by Boeing technicians, and the aircraft was returned to service. The aircraft had flown for 8,830 hours at the time of the tailstrike incident.

Crew 
At the time of the accident, the aircraft was on the fifth of its six planned flights of the day. The flight had 15 crew members, including 3 cockpit crew and 12 cabin crew.

The cockpit crew consisted of:
 Captain  served as a training instructor for First Officer Yutaka Sasaki on the flight, supervising him while handling the radio communications, while also acting as the first officer. Takahama was a veteran pilot, having logged around 12,423 total flight hours, roughly 4,842 hours of which were accumulated flying 747s. Takahama was aged 49 at the time of the accident.
 First Officer  was undergoing training for promotion to the rank of captain, and flew Flight 123 as one of his final training/evaluation flights, acting as captain on the flight. Sasaki, who was 39 years old at the time of the accident, had about 3,963 total flight hours to his credit, and had logged roughly 2,665 hours in the 747.
 Flight Engineer , a 46-year-old veteran flight engineer, had approximately 9,831 total flight hours, of which roughly 3,846 hours were accrued flying 747s.

Passengers 

The flight was around the Obon holiday period in Japan when many Japanese people make yearly trips to their hometowns or resorts. Twenty-two non-Japanese were on board the flight. By August 13, 1985, a spokesman for Japan Airlines stated that the list included four residents of Hong Kong, two each from Italy and the United States, and one each from West Germany and the United Kingdom. Some foreigners had dual nationalities, and some of them were residents of Japan.

The four survivors, all women, were seated on the left side and toward the middle of seat rows 54–60, in the rear of the aircraft.

Kyu Sakamoto, who was famous for singing "Ue o Muite Arukō", known in Anglophone countries under the title "Sukiyaki", was among those who perished in the crash.

As the flight connected two of the largest cities of Japan, a number of other celebrities also initially booked this flight, but ultimately avoided the tragedy by either switching to another flight or opting to use the Tokaido Shinkansen instead. These include Sanma Akashiya, Masataka Itsumi and his family, Johnny Kitagawa, and the cast of Shōten at the time. Members of the Shonentai were also scheduled to travel with Kitagawa, but ultimately stayed behind in Tokyo.

Sequence of events

Take-off and decompression 

The aircraft landed at Haneda from Chitose Airport at 4:50p.m. as JL514. After more than an hour on the ground, Flight 123 pushed back from gate 18 at 6:04p.m. and took off from Runway 15L at Haneda Airport in Ōta, Tokyo, Japan, at 6:12p.m., 12 minutes behind schedule. At about 6:24p.m. A photograph taken from the ground confirmed that the vertical stabilizer was missing.

The pilots set their transponder to broadcast a distress signal. Afterward, Captain Takahama contacted Tokyo Area Control Center to declare an emergency, and to request to return to Haneda Airport, descending and following emergency landing vectors to Oshima. Tokyo Control approved a right-hand turn to a heading of 090° east back towards Oshima, and the aircraft entered an initial right-hand bank of 40°,several degrees greater than observed previously. Captain Takahama, alarmed, ordered First Officer Sasaki to bank the aircraft back ("Don't bank so much."). When the aircraft did not respond to the control wheel being turned left, he expressed confusion, after which the flight engineer reported that the hydraulic pressure was dropping. The captain repeated the order to reduce the bank, as the autopilot had disengaged.  He then ordered the first officer to bank it back, then ordered him to pull up.  All of these maneuvers produced no response. At this point, the pilots realized that the aircraft had become virtually uncontrollable, and Captain Takahama ordered the copilot to descend.

6:27–6:34p.m.
Heading over the Izu Peninsula at 6:26p.m., the aircraft turned away from the Pacific Ocean, and back towards the shore. Due to the apparent loss of control, the aircraft did not follow Tokyo Control's directions and only turned right far enough to fly a north-westerly course. Seeing that the aircraft was still flying west away from Haneda, Tokyo Control contacted the aircraft again. After confirming that the pilots were declaring an emergency, the controller requested as to the nature of the emergency. At this point, hypoxia appears to have begun setting in, as the pilots did not respond. Also, the captain and co-pilot asked the flight engineer repeatedly if hydraulic pressure was lost, seemingly unable to comprehend it. (Flight engineer: "Hydro pressure all loss." Co-pilot: "All loss?" Captain: "No, look." Flight engineer: "All loss." Co-pilot: "All loss?" Flight Engineer: "Yes.") Tokyo Control then contacted the aircraft again and repeated the direction to descend and turn to a 90° heading to Oshima. Only then did the captain report that the aircraft had become uncontrollable. (Tokyo: "Japan Air 124 [sic] fly heading 090 radar vector to Oshima." JAL123: "But now uncontrol." Tokyo: "Uncontrol, roger understood.")

After traversing Suruga Bay and passing over Yaizu, Shizuoka, at 6:31:02p.m., Tokyo Control asked the crew if they could descend, and Captain Takahama replied that they were now descending, and stated that the aircraft's altitude was  after Tokyo Control requested their altitude. The flight data recorder shows that the flight did not descend, but was instead rising and falling uncontrollably. Hydraulic fluid completely drained away through the rupture. With the total loss of hydraulic control and non-functional control surfaces, the aircraft began up and down oscillations in phugoid cycles lasting about 90 seconds each, during which the aircraft's airspeed decreased as it climbed, then increased as it fell. The rise in airspeed increased the lift over the wings, which resulted in the aircraft climbing and slowing down, then descending and gaining speed again. The loss of the vertical stabilizer and the rudder removed the only means of damping yaw, and the aircraft lost virtually all meaningful yaw stability. Almost immediately after the separation of the stabilizer, the aircraft began to exhibit Dutch roll, simultaneously yawing right and banking left, before yawing back left and banking right. At some points during the flight, the banking motion became very profound, with the banks in large arcs around 50° back and forth in cycles of 12 seconds.

Despite the complete loss of control, the pilots continued to turn the control wheel, pull on the control column, and move the rudder pedals up until the moment of the crash. The pilots also began efforts to establish control using differential engine thrust, as the aircraft slowly wandered back towards Haneda. Their efforts were of limited success. This is possibly due to the effects of hypoxia at such altitudes, as the pilots seemed to have difficulty comprehending their situation as the aircraft pitched and rolled uncontrollably. The pilots possibly were focused, instead, on the cause of the explosion they heard, and the subsequent difficulty in controlling the jet. The flight engineer did say they should put on their oxygen masks when word reached the cockpit that the rear-most passenger masks had stopped working. None of the pilots put on their oxygen masks, however, though the captain simply replied "yes" to both suggestions by the flight engineer to do so. The accident report indicates that the captain's disregard of the suggestion is one of several features "regarded as hypoxia-related in [the] CVR record[ing]." Their voices can be heard relatively clearly on the cockpit area microphone for the entire duration, until the crash, indicating that they did not put on their oxygen masks at any point in the flight.

6:34–6:48p.m. 
Shortly before 6:34p.m., Japan Air Tokyo attempted to call the flight via the selective-calling system multiple times. At 6:35p.m., the flight responded, with the flight engineer handling communications to the company. The company stated that they had been monitoring the emergency, and had stopped working, replied that they believed the R-5 door was broken and were making an emergency descent. Japan Air Tokyo asked if they intended to return to Haneda, to which the flight engineer responded that they were making an emergency descent, and to continue to monitor them.

Eventually, the pilots were able to control of the aircraft by adjusting engine thrust, and in doing so, they were able to dampen the phugoid cycle and somewhat stabilize their altitude. Suppressing the Dutch roll was another matter, as the engines cannot respond quickly enough to counter the Dutch roll. According to the accident report, "Suppressing of Dutch roll mode by use of the differential thrust between the right and left engines is estimated practically impossible for a pilot." Shortly after 6:40p.m., the landing gear was lowered in an attempt to damp the phugoid cycles and Dutch rolls further, and to attempt to decrease the aircraft's airspeed to descend. This was somewhat successful, as the phugoid cycles were dampened almost completely, and the Dutch roll was damped significantly, but lowering the gear also decreased the directional control the pilots were getting by applying power to one side of the aircraft, and the aircrew's ability to control the aircraft deteriorated.

Shortly after lowering the gear, the flight engineer asked if the speed brakes should be used ("Shall we use speed brakes?"), but the pilots did not acknowledge the request. The aircraft then began a right-hand descending 420° turn from a heading of 040° at 6:40p.m. to a heading of 100° at 6:45p.m., flying in a loop over Otsuki, due to a thrust imbalance created from having the power setting on Engine 1 (the left-most engine) higher than the other three engines. At this time, the aircraft began to turn slowly to the left, while continuing to descend. The thicker air allowed the pilots more oxygen, and their hypoxia appeared to have subsided somewhat, as they were communicating more frequently. The pilots also appeared to be understanding how grave their situation had become, with Captain Takahama exclaiming, "This may be hopeless" at 6:46:33p.m. At 6:47p.m., the pilots recognized that they were beginning to turn towards the mountains, and despite efforts by the crew to get the aircraft to continue to turn right, it instead turned left, flying directly towards the mountainous terrain on a westerly heading.

Around 6:47p.m., a photographer on the ground captured a photograph of the aircraft, which showed that the vertical stabilizer was missing.

6:48–6:55p.m. 

As the aircraft continued west, it descended below  and was getting dangerously close to the mountains. The lower altitude and thicker air caused the cabin altitude alert to momentarily turn itself off at this time, before resuming for the rest of the flight. The captain briefly ordered maximum engine power to attempt to get the aircraft to climb to avoid the mountains, and engine power was added abruptly at 6:48p.m., before being reduced back to near idle, then at 6:49p.m., it was ordered raised again. This greatly excited the phugoid motion, and the aircraft pitched up, before pitching back down after power was reduced. The captain immediately ordered maximum power at 6:49:40p.m. as the stick shaker sounded ("Ah, no good... Stall. Max power. Max power. Max power."). The aircraft's airspeed increased as it was brought into an unsteady climb. Possibly as a measure to prevent a recurrence of stalling, due to the lowered airspeed caused by the drag of the landing gear, the crew quickly discussed lowering the flaps. Without hydraulics, the captain expressed that this would not work, but the flight engineer pointed out this could be done via an alternate electrical system. At 6:51p.m., the captain lowered the flaps 5 units as an additional attempt to exert control over the stricken jet. During the period from 6:49:03 – 6:52:11p.m., Japan Air Tokyo attempted to call the aircraft via the selective-calling radio system. During the entire 3-minute period, the SELCAL alarm continued to ring according to the CVR recordings, the pilots most likely ignored it due to the difficulty they were experiencing at the time.

The aircraft reached  at 6:53p.m., when the captain reported an uncontrollable aircraft for the third time. Shortly afterward, the controller asked the crew to switch the radio frequency to 119.7 to talk to the Tokyo Approach ("Japan Air 123, switch the frequency to 119.7 please!"), and while the pilots did not acknowledge the request over the radio, they did as instructed (Captain: "Yes, Yes, 119.7" Co-pilot: "Ah, Yes, number 2" Captain: "119.7"  Co-pilot: "Yes" Flight Engineer: "Shall we try?" Co-pilot: "Yes"). Tokyo Approach then contacted the flight via the SELCAL system, briefly activating the SELCAL alarm again until the flight engineer responded to Tokyo's request. At this point, the captain asked the flight engineer to request their position (Captain: "Request position" Flight engineer: "Request position"). At 6:55p.m., the captain requested flap extension, and the co-pilot called out a flap extension to 10 units, while the flaps were already being extended from 5 units at 6:54:30p.m.. This began to cause the aircraft to begin to a bank to the right, possibly due to an imbalance in the lift between the left and right flaps. Power was increased at the same time. A differential thrust setting caused engine power on the left side to be slightly higher than on the right side. This contributed to further increasing the bank angle to the right.

One minute later, the flaps were extended to 25 units, which caused the aircraft to bank dramatically to the right beyond 60°, and the nose began to drop. Captain Takahama immediately ordered the flaps to be retracted ("Hey, halt the flap"), and power was added abruptly, but still with engine power higher on the left vs. the right engines. The captain was heard on the CVR desperately requesting for the flaps to be retracted and for more power to be applied in a last-ditch effort to raise the nose (Captain: "Power! Flap stop crowding together." Co-pilot: "Flap up, flap up, flap up, flap up!" Captain: "Flap up?" Co-pilot: "Yes." Captain: "Power. Power! Flap!" Flight engineer: "It is up!" Captain: "Raise the nose. Raise the nose! Power!"). The aircraft continued to enter an unrecoverable right-hand descent into the mountains as the engines were pushed to full power, during which the ground proximity warning system sounded, and the captain knew it was too late to recover (Captain: "It's the end!"). In the final moments, as the airspeed exceeded , the pitch attitude leveled out and the aircraft ceased descending, with the aircraft and passengers/crew being subjected to 3 g of upward vertical acceleration.

6:56p.m. Time of impact

The backward shock of the impact, measuring 0.14 g, in addition to causing the loss of the thrust of the 4th engine, caused the aircraft to bank sharply back to the right, and the nose to drop again. This impact is speculated to have separated the remainder of the weakened tail from the airframe, the outer third of the right-wing, as well as the remaining three engines, which were "dispersed  ahead". The impact registered on a seismometer located in the Shin-Etsu Earthquake Observatory at Tokyo University from 6:56:27p.m. as a small shock, to 6:56:32p.m. as a larger shock, believed to have been caused by the final crash. The shockwaves took an estimated 2.0–2.3 seconds to reach the seismometer, making the estimated time of the final crash 6:56:30p.m.

After the crash 
Ed Magnuson of Time magazine said that the area where the aircraft crashed was referred to as the "Tibet" of Gunma Prefecture. The elapsed time from the bulkhead failure to the crash was 32 minutes.

Delayed rescue operation 

A United States Air Force navigator stationed at Yokota Air Base published an account in 1995 that stated that the U.S. military had monitored the distress calls and prepared a search-and-rescue operation that was aborted at the call of Japanese authorities. A U.S. Air Force C-130 crew was the first to spot the crash site 20 minutes after impact, while it was still daylight, and radioed the location to the Japanese and Yokota Air Base, where an Iroquois helicopter was dispatched. An article in the Pacific Stars and Stripes from 1985 stated that personnel at Yokota were on standby to help with rescue operations, but were never called by the Japanese government.

A JSDF helicopter later spotted the wreck after nightfall. Poor visibility and the difficult mountainous terrain prevented it from landing at the site. The pilot reported from the air no signs of survivors. Based on this report, JSDF personnel on the ground did not set out to the site on the night of the crash. Instead, they were dispatched to spend the night at a makeshift village erecting tents, constructing helicopter landing ramps, and engaging in other preparations,  from the crash site. Rescue teams set out for the site the following morning. Medical staff later found bodies with injuries suggesting that people had survived the crash only to die from shock, exposure overnight in the mountains, or injuries that, if tended to earlier, would not have been fatal. One doctor said, "If the discovery had come 10 hours earlier, we could have found more survivors."

One of the four survivors, off-duty Japan Air Lines flight purser  recounted from her hospital bed that she recalled bright lights and the sound of helicopter rotors shortly after she awoke amid the wreckage, and while she could hear screaming and moaning from other survivors, these sounds gradually died away during the night.

Investigation 
The official cause of the crash according to the report published by Japan's Aircraft Accident Investigation Commission is:

 The aircraft was involved in a tailstrike incident at Osaka International Airport seven years earlier as JAL Flight 115, which damaged the aircraft's aft pressure bulkhead.
 The subsequent repair of the bulkhead did not conform to Boeing's approved repair methods. For reinforcing a damaged bulkhead, Boeing's repair procedure calls for one continuous splice plate with three rows of rivets. The Boeing repair technicians, however, had used two splice plates parallel to the stress crack. Cutting the plate in this manner negated the effectiveness of one of the rows of rivets, reducing the part's resistance to fatigue cracking to about 70% of that for a correct repair. The post-repair inspection by JAL did not discover the defect, as it was covered by overlapping plates. During the investigation, the Accident Investigation Commission calculated that this incorrect installation would fail after about 11,000 pressurization cycles; the aircraft accomplished 12,318 successful flights from the time that the faulty repair was made to when the crash happened.
 Consequently, after repeated pressurization cycles during normal flight, the bulkhead gradually started to crack near one of the two rows of rivets holding it together. When it finally failed, the resulting rapid decompression ruptured the lines of all four hydraulic systems and ejected the vertical stabilizer. With many of the aircraft's flight controls disabled, the aircraft became uncontrollable.

In an unrelated incident on 19 August 1982, while under the control of the first officer, JA8119 suffered a runway strike of the No. 4 engine on landing at Chitose Air Base in poor visibility. This was repaired successfully and the aircraft again returned to service. This incident did not contribute to the Flight 123 accident.

Aftermath and legacy 

The Japanese public's confidence in Japan Air Lines took a dramatic downturn in the wake of the disaster, with passenger numbers on domestic routes dropping by one-third. Rumors persisted that Boeing had admitted fault to cover up shortcomings in the airline's inspection procedures, thereby protecting the reputation of a major customer. In the months after the crash, domestic traffic decreased by as much as 25%. In 1986, for the first time in a decade, fewer passengers boarded JAL's overseas flights during the New Year period than the previous year. Some of them considered switching to All Nippon Airways, JAL's main competitor, as a safer alternative.

JAL paid ¥780 million (US$7.6 million) to the victims' relatives in the form of "condolence money" without admitting liability. JAL president Yasumoto Takagi resigned. In the aftermath of the incident, Hiroo Tominaga, a JAL maintenance manager, died from suicide intended to atone for the incident, as did Susumu Tajima, an engineer who had inspected and cleared the aircraft as flightworthy, due to difficulties at work.

In compliance with standard procedures, Japan Air Lines retired flight number 123 for their Haneda-Itami routes, changing it to Flight 121 and Flight 127 on September 1, 1985. While Boeing 747s were still used on the same route operating with the new flight numbers in the years following the crash, they were replaced by the Boeing 767 or Boeing 777 in the mid-1990s. Boeing 747-100SRs continued to serve JAL on domestic routes until their retirement in 2006, having been replaced by newer widebody aircraft such as the Boeing 747-400D and Boeing 777, introduced during the 1990s and early 2000s. Boeing 747 operations at JAL ended in 2011 when the last 747-400 was returned to the lessor as part of the airline’s efforts to cut costs, with twin-engined widebodies such as the Boeing 777, Boeing 787 Dreamliner, and Airbus A350 utilized on the routes instead.

In 2009, stairs with a handrail were installed to facilitate visitors' access to the crash site. Japan Land, Infrastructure, Transport, and Tourism Minister Seiji Maehara visited the site on August 12, 2010, to remember the victims. Families of the victims, together with local volunteer groups, hold an annual memorial gathering every August 12 near the crash site in Gunma Prefecture.

The crash led to the 2006 opening of the Safety Promotion Center, which is located in the Daini Sogo Building on the grounds of Haneda Airport. This center was created for training purposes to alert employees to the importance of airline safety and their responsibility to ensure safety.  The center has displays regarding aviation safety, the history of the crash, and selected pieces of the aircraft and passenger effects (including handwritten farewell notes). It is open to the public by appointment made two months before the visit.

The captain's daughter, Yoko Takahama, who was a high-school student at the time of the crash, went on to become a flight attendant for Japan Air Lines.

Japanese banker Akihisa Yukawa had an undisclosed second family at the time he died in the crash. (His wife had earlier suffered severe brain injuries.) His girlfriend, Susanne Bayly, was pregnant with their second daughter at the time of the crash; she subsequently returned to London, where Yukawa and she had met, bringing with her their daughters. To avoid embarrassment to Yukawa's family, she accepted a settlement of £340,000, rather than claiming under the airline's compensation scheme. In 2002, the airline made a payment of an undisclosed amount to enable the daughters, Cassie and Diana, to complete their educations.

On June 24, 2022, an oxygen mask belonging to Japan Air Lines Flight 123 was found near the crash site during road repair work. The discovery came nearly a year after engine parts were also found in the same area.

In popular culture 
 The events of Flight 123 were featured in "Out of Control," a season-three (2005) episode of the Canadian TV series Mayday, which is entitled Air Emergency and Air Disasters in the U.S., and Air Crash Investigation in the UK and elsewhere around the world. The dramatization was broadcast with the title "" in Japan. The flight was also included in a Mayday season-six (2007) Science of Disaster special, entitled "Fatal Flaw", which was broadcast with the title "Fatal Fix" in the United Kingdom, Australia, and Asia. The crash was covered again in season 23 of Mayday, in the episode titled "Pressure Point".
 It is featured in season 1, episode 2, of the TV show Why Planes Crash, in an episode called "Breaking Point".
 The documentary series Aircrash Confidential featured the crash in a second-season episode titled "Poor Maintenance", which first aired on March 15, 2012, on the Discovery Channel in the United Kingdom.
 The National Geographic Channel's documentary series Seconds from Disaster featured the accident in season six, episode six, titled "Terrified over Tokyo", released December 3, 2012.
 Climber's High, the best-selling novel by Hideo Yokoyama, revolves around the reporting of the crash at the fictional newspaper Kita-Kanto Shimbun. Yokoyama was a journalist at the Jōmō Shimbun at the time of the crash. A film released in 2008, and also titled Climber's High, is based on the novel.
 In 2009, the film Shizumanu Taiyō, starring Ken Watanabe, was released for national distribution in Japan. The film gives a semifictional account of the internal airline corporate disputes and politics surrounding the crash. The film does not mention Japanese Air Lines by name, using the name "National Airlines",  instead. JAL not only refused to co-operate with the making of the film, but also bitterly criticized the film, saying that it "not only damages public trust in the company but [also] could lead to a loss of customers." The movie features music by Diana Yukawa, whose father was one of the victims of this disaster.
 The cockpit voice recording of the incident was incorporated into the script of a 1999 play called Charlie Victor Romeo.
 The 2004 album Reise, Reise by German Neue Deutsche Härte band Rammstein is loosely inspired by the crash. The final moments of the cockpit voice recording are hidden in the pregap of the first track on some CD pressings of the album.

See also
 List of accidents and incidents involving commercial aircraft
 China Airlines Flight 611 which crashed on 25 May 2002 due to faulty repair-maintenance of a similar tail-strike 22 years prior

Bibliography 
 
 
  (Tailstrike incident report)

References

External links 

 Learning from the Past Japan Air Lines
 Crash of Japan Air Lines B-747 at Mt. Osutaka
 JAL123 CVR (cockpit voice recorder) transcript
 "Christopher Hood's Research about JL123."
 
 The record of JAL123 (Japanese with English place names) (Archive)
 
 
 
 
 Planesafe.org: JAL123 (Archive)
 The New York Times: J.A.L.'s Post-Crash Troubles

 Aviation accidents and incidents caused by loss of control
 Airliner accidents and incidents caused by in-flight structural failure
 Airliner accidents and incidents involving in-flight depressurization
 Airliner accidents and incidents caused by maintenance errors
 Aviation accidents and incidents in Japan
 Aviation accidents and incidents in 1985
1985 in Japan
123
 Accidents and incidents involving the Boeing 747
 August 1985 events in Asia
 History of the Japan Air Self-Defense Force
Airliner accidents and incidents caused by tailstrikes